Chrysotoxum triarcuatum is a species of hoverfly endemic to the Canary Islands.

References

Diptera of Europe
Syrphinae
Insects described in 1839
Endemic fauna of the Canary Islands
Insects of the Canary Islands
Taxa named by Pierre-Justin-Marie Macquart